Christos Liatsos (born 1 September 2003) is a Greek professional footballer who plays as a midfielder for Super League 2 club Olympiacos B.

Career statistics

Club

Notes
Honours

 Greek Cup : 2019-20

References

2003 births
Living people
Greece youth international footballers
Association football midfielders
Super League Greece players
Olympiacos F.C. players
Footballers from Athens
Greek footballers
Super League Greece 2 players
Olympiacos F.C. B players